Inayat is a unisex first name in Middle East and South Asia. It may refer to:

People
 Enayat Khan, sitar and surbahar player.
 Fazal Inayat-Khan, grandson of Inayat Khan.
 Hidayat Inayat Khan, son of Inayat Khan.
 Inayat Hussain Khan, Indian classical vocalist.
 Inayat Khan, Universal Sufism and founder of the Sufi Order International. 
 Inayat Ollah Khan Niazi, Pakistan Army officer.
 Noor Inayat Khan, daughter of Inayat Khan. 
 Vilayat Inayat Khan, son of Inayat Khan.
 Zia Inayat Khan, grandson of Inayat Khan.
 Inayat Bunglawala is media secretary of the Muslim Council of Britain. 
 Shah Inayat Qadiri, Sufi saint of Qadiriyyah Silsilah

Places
 Inayatabad

See also 
 Inayatullah (disambiguation)
 Inayat Khan (disambiguation)

Iranian given names